Labeo worthingtoni is a species of benthopelagic, freshwater ray-finned fish in genus Labeo which is endemic to Lake Malawi and is now considered extinct.

References 

worthingtoni
Fish described in 1958
Fish of Lake Malawi
Cyprinid fish of Africa